is a highway between Imizu, Toyama Prefecture and Gujo, Gifu Prefecture in Japan.

Route description
Length: 187.7 km (including closed sections)
Origin: Imizu, Toyama Prefecture at the intersection with Route 415 at Shinkō-no-mori
Terminus: Gujo, Gifu Prefecture at the intersection with Route 156 at Jōnan-chō
Main cities en route: Toyama, Takayama
Designated section: Part of National Route 41 system

References

472
Roads in Gifu Prefecture
Roads in Toyama Prefecture